Hennadii Kryvosheia (was born on July, 1977, Bohuslav city, Kyiv Region) is a Ukrainian politician. A People's Deputy of Ukraine of the VIIIth convocation.

Education
Higher Education, Specialist‚ National Pedagogical Dragomanov University‚ 2002‚ History (History and Law Teacher); Higher. Bohuslav Ivan Nechuy-Levytsky pedagogical college 1997‚ Elementary Education (Elementary School Teacher‚ an organizer of work with pupils’ societies).
Languages Knowledge: Ukrainian, Russian – fluently, English – read and translate with a dictionary.

Labour and Political Activity
 September 1993 — July 1997 — a student of Bohuslav Humanitarian College.
 September 1997 — July 2002 — a student of National Pedagogical Dragomanov University.
 November 2001 — November 2003 — promo-manager partnership «Pals-LTD».
 November 2003 — February 2004 — a director of partnership "Advertising Company «Novovyd».
 January 2004 — December 2007 — a manager in marketing outlet widening‚ director's deputy partnership «В. І. К. Оil Ukraine».
 September — November 2010 — the adviser of executive committee — the director of public receiving office of organization «Front for Change».
 October 2011 — February 2012 — a main specialist of the City Building Control Department of Communal Organization of executive body of Kyiv City Council «Institute of General Plan, Kyiv».
 December 2012 — April 2014 — assistant-consultant of People's Deputy of Ukraine Leonid Yemets.
 A Deputy of Podilskyi District Council in Kyiv City Council of the V convocation.
 From April 17 to August 15, 2014 — the head of Pechersk Region State Administration in Kyiv.
 A people's deputy of Ukraine of the VIIIthe convocation, since November 27, 2014, from the party «People's Front (Ukraine)».
The head of subcommittee on the questions of enterprising and technical regulation of the Verkhovna Rada of Ukraine on the questions of industrial policy and enterprising.

In the 2019 Ukrainian parliamentary election Kryvosheia failed as an independent candidate in constituency 93 (in Kyiv Oblast) to get reelected to parliament. He lost this election with 6.60% of the votes to Anna Skorokhod (who won with 43,90% of the votes).

In the 2020 Kyiv local election (set for 25 October 2020) Kryvosheia is a candidate for the Kyiv City Council in Pecherskyi District for For the Future.

Notes

References 

1977 births
Living people
Politicians from Kyiv
Seventh convocation members of the Verkhovna Rada
Eighth convocation members of the Verkhovna Rada
People's Front (Ukraine) politicians